

Anapsids

Newly named anapsids

Archosauromorphs

Newly named basal archosauromorphs

Newly named dinosaurs
Data courtesy of George Olshevsky's dinosaur genera list.

Plesiosaurs

Newly named plesiosaurs

Mammals

Newly named cetaceans

References

1840s in paleontology
Paleontology